Events from the year 1178 in Ireland.

Incumbent
Lord: John

Events

 St. Werburgh's Church in Dublin is established.

Deaths
Áedh Ua Flaithbheartaigh, king of Iar Connacht

References

 
1170s in Ireland
Ireland
Years of the 12th century in Ireland